San Juan de Aznalfarache is a city located in the province of Seville, Spain. According to the 2006 census (INE), the city has a population of 20,121 inhabitants.

Despite being a separate municipality, San Juan is in the metropolitan area of Seville, to which it lies on an opposite bank of the Guadalquivir river. The city is linked by two road bridges and a pedestrian one to the Sevillian district of Triana on the Isla de La Cartuja.

San Juan lies to the north of Gelves, northeast of Mairena del Aljarafe and south of Tomares, which all also make up Seville's metropolitan area.

The city's name refers to the Fortress of Alfaraj (ar: حصن الفرج), a known site for muslim historians, which was likely built under the Umayyads but better known by the palace built by Al-Mu'tamid ibn Abbad in the 11th century

Notable people
El Sevilla (born 1970), actor and singer

References

External links
San Juan de Aznalfarache - Sistema de Información Multiterritorial de Andalucía

Municipalities of the Province of Seville